Godfrey Arthur Matheson (October 29, 1881 – January 20, 1978) was a Canadian ice hockey coach. Matheson was head coach of the Chicago Black Hawks for one season, 1932–33, along with Emil Iverson.

Career
On October 15, 1931,  Matheson was named coach of the Chicago Blackhawks. He attempted to innovate coaching by using a whistle system; One whistle to pass, two for a shot etc. He also expected Taffy Abel to score two goals a game while screening the goaltender. Matheson only lasted for two NHL games with the Chicago Black Hawks before being fired by team owner Major Frederic McLaughlin.

Coaching record

References
Godfrey Matheson at Hockey-Reference

Notes

Canadian ice hockey coaches
Chicago Blackhawks coaches
Sportspeople from Manitoba
1881 births
1978 deaths